N. Devassia Appachan (N.D Appachan) is an Indian National Congress politician from Kerala, India. He represented Sulthan Bathery Assembly constituency in 11th Kerala Legislative Assembly.

Biography
N. D. Appachan was born on May 2, 1949, to N. J. Devassia and Annamma. He lives in Kakkavayal, Wayanad district. He and his wife Tressia have 3 children.

Political career
Appachan, who was the first elected District Congress Committee (DCC) President of Wayanad District in 1991, served as the DCC President and Wayanad District UDF Chairman till 2004. In 2021 he was re-elected DCC President.

He was elected to the 11th Kerala Legislative Assembly in 2001. He represented Sulthan Bathery Assembly constituency as an Indian National Congress candidate. He resigned from the post on July 5, 2005.

Controversies
In 2022, a complaint was filed against Appachan by a tribal woman who was Youth Congress Mananthavady Constituency secretary alleging that she was abused by him for her caste and gender. But the Adivasi Congress Mananthavady constituency committee said the allegations are baseless.

References 

1949 births
Living people
Malayali politicians
Indian National Congress politicians from Kerala
Kerala MLAs 2001–2006